Selfie is a 2018 Russian drama film directed by Nikolay Khomeriki and starring Konstantin Khabensky and Feodor Bondarchuk. The film is based on the novel Soulless of the 21st century. Selfie by Sergey Minaev. The picture was released on 1 February 2018.

Plot
The protagonist - popular writer and TV presenter Vladimir Bogdanov, suddenly is replaced with an absolute double. He takes Bogdanov's job, fame, wife, mistress and handles his role much better than the original. And only the daughter wants the return of the real Bogdanov.

Cast
 Konstantin Khabensky — Vladimir Bogdanov
 Feodor Bondarchuk — Max
 Yulia Khlynina — Zhanna
 Anna Mikhalkova — Vika
 Severija Janušauskaitė — Lera

Marketing
For its February issue Esquire Russia placed Konstantin Khabensky's selfie on the cover. It was the first time that a Russian magazine was published with a cover shot on an iPhone.

Reception

Box office
The film was a Russian box-office leader of the February 1–4 weekend — the film collected 125.1 million rubles.

Critical response
The film received mixed reviews. Khabensky's acting and cinematography by Opelyants received considerable praise, but many reviewers have criticized the screenplay.

See also
 Soulless – a 2012 film written by Sergey Minaev
 The Double – an 1846 novella by Fyodor Dostoyevsky

References

External links 

Russian drama films
2018 drama films
Films directed by Nikolay Khomeriki
Films produced by Fyodor Bondarchuk